Wurmiella is an extinct conodont genus.

Wurmiella excavata is from the Lower Devonian of Nevada.

References

External links 
 

 Wurmiella at fossilworks.org (retrieved 30 April 2016)
 Wurmiella excavata at fossilworks.org (retrieved 30 April 2016)

Ozarkodinida genera
Paleozoic life of Ontario